Christoph Koncz (born September 3, 1987, in Konstanz) is an Austrian-Hungarian classical musician. He performs internationally as a conductor, violin soloist, chamber musician and principal violinist of the Vienna Philharmonic. At the age of just nine, he received worldwide acclaim for starring as child prodigy Kaspar Weiss in the Canadian feature film The Red Violin, which won the 1999 Academy Award for Best Original Score.

Biography
Born in 1987 in Konstanz into an Austrian-Hungarian family of musicians, Christoph Koncz received his first violin lesson at the age of four and entered the Vienna University of Music only two years later, studying with Eugenia Polatschek. He went on to study violin with Josef Hell, Igor Ozim and Boris Kuschnir at the Music Universities of Vienna, Salzburg and Graz as well as conducting with Mark Stringer in Vienna. Master classes with Daniel Barenboim and Daniel Harding further enriched his musical education.

He made his North American debut as a soloist aged twelve with the Montreal Symphony Orchestra conducted by Charles Dutoit, leading to collaborations with conductors such as Sir Neville Marriner, Dmitry Sitkovetsky, Gábor Takács-Nagy and Marc Minkowski. Further engagements have taken him to numerous countries across Europe and to the Middle East, Asia and Australia as well as North and South America.

Much in demand as a chamber musician, Christoph Koncz's musical partners include Leonidas Kavakos, Joshua Bell, Vilde Frang, Renaud Capuçon, Antoine Tamestit, Kim Kashkashian, Gautier Capuçon and Rudolf Buchbinder. He also performs frequently with his brother Stephan Koncz, a sought-after cellist and member of the Berlin Philharmonic. They are both recipients of the European Music Prize for Youth.

In 2008, at the age of twenty, Christoph Koncz was appointed principal second violin of the Vienna Philharmonic, a position he has held since.

Following his recording of works by Heise and Gade and many radio and TV broadcasts, Christoph Koncz's world premiere recording of Ernst Krenek’s Concertino (Op. 27) with the Academy of St Martin in the Fields conducted by Sir Neville Marriner was published on Chandos Records in 2013. Furthermore, Deutsche Grammophon released an album with Johannes Brahms’s Clarinet Quintet, recorded by Christoph Koncz together with Leonidas Kavakos, Antoine Tamestit, Stephan Koncz and Andreas Ottensamer in 2015. From a live performance at the 2016 Aix Easter Festival, an album containing both String Sextets by Johannes Brahms alongside Renaud Capuçon, Gérard Caussé, Marie Chilemme, Gautier Capuçon and Clemens Hagen was released on Erato to great critical acclaim, winning a Diapason d'Or in June 2017.

His conducting debut at the 2013 Salzburg Mozartwoche was followed by concerts at such prestigious venues as the Berlin, Cologne and Munich Philharmonie, Vienna Konzerthaus and KKL Lucerne as well as at the Salzburg Festival. He has enjoyed a close relationship with the Verbier Festival Chamber Orchestra and the renowned French period instrument ensemble Les Musiciens du Louvre. In 2017, Christoph Koncz made his US conducting debut with the Memphis Symphony and conducted the Tonhalle-Orchester Zürich in a masterclass with David Zinman. He made his subscription debut at the Cologne Philharmonie with Concerto Köln in June 2018 and took the Orchestre Métropolitain de Montréal on tour in March 2019. During the 2020/21 season Christoph Koncz will make his opera debut at the Berliner Staatsoper Unter den Linden (Gluck: Orfeo ed Euridice) and appear for the first time with the Orchestre de la Suisse Romande (Tchaikovsky, Brahms) and the Hong Kong Philharmonic (Schubert, Weber, R. Strauss). He will return to the Philharmonia Orchestra London and conduct the Royal Northern Sinfonia's New Year's Concerts. Christoph Koncz is in his second season as Chief Conductor of the Deutsche Kammerakademie Neuss am Rhein and will perform with the orchestra at the Concertgebouw Amsterdam (Mendelssohn, Beethoven). The soloists he is going to collaborate with in this season include Kristian Bezuidenhout, Khatia Buniatishvili and Sabine Meyer.

Christoph Koncz performs on the "Brüstlein" Stradivarius of 1707 on generous loan by the National Bank of Austria.

Discography
 2020: Mozart’s Violin – The Complete Violin Concertos, Les Musiciens du Louvre, Sony Classical

References

External links
Christoph Koncz – Official site
Christoph Koncz on Facebook
Christoph Koncz on Twitter
Christoph Koncz on Instagram
HarrisonParrott artist profile
Beethoven: Symphony No. 1, performed by Christoph Koncz and the Verbier Festival Chamber Orchestra in November 2016

1987 births
Living people
Austrian male musicians
Austrian conductors (music)
Austrian violinists
Hungarian classical violinists
Male classical violinists
21st-century Hungarian male musicians
21st-century classical violinists